Sándor Kiss may refer to:

 Sándor Kiss (footballer) (born 1956), Hungarian footballer
 Sándor Kiss (gymnast) (1941-2012), Hungarian Olympic gymnast
 Sándor Kiss (wrestler) (born 1962), Hungarian wrestler

See also
 Kiss (surname)